Spalony Dwór  is a village in the administrative district of Gmina Prudnik, within Prudnik County, Opole Voivodeship, in south-western Poland, close to the Czech border.

According to Meyers Gazetteer, 13 people lived in Spalony Dwór. Currently the village is uninhabited.

References 

Villages in Prudnik County
Former populated places in Poland